Saipa Football Club (Bashgah-e Futbal-e Saipa) is a football club from Tehran, Iran. The team is owned by SAIPA, an Iranian automobile manufacturer. The team has never had a large fanbase, despite some success. It is known to have one of the best youth academies in Iranian football and regularly promotes academy players to the first team.

In the 2006–07 season, under the guidance of Ali Daei, Saipa won their only Persian Gulf Cup title. Saipa has also won the Azadegan League twice and the Hazfi Cup once.

Saipa is the football club of the multisport Saipa Cultural and Athletic Corporation.

History

Early days
In 1989, SAIPA Company decided to start its own football team. They purchased a team playing in the 4th division of Tehran's city league, and renamed it Saipa F.C. After back to back promotions starting in the first year, the Karaj based club was playing in the 2nd division by 1991. That same year they purchased the Shipping Department team's shares, and participated in the 1st division of Tehran's local league. In that year they won the Tehran city championship as well as the Tehran Super Cup, thus attaining the right to play in Iran's top league at the time, the Azadegan League.

Azadegan League
In their first year in the Azadegan League they won the championship, as well as the Hazfi Cup. They also won the league championship again in 1994 marking an unusually successful first five years for the club in Iranian football. The team was relegated into the second division in 1995, but were promoted again in the following year.

Since their second promotion to the top tier, the club has remained in the middle of the league table, and has often included some of the country's most well known players.

Persian Gulf Pro League

Ali Daei era
By 2001, the club's on-field performance remained stable, occupying mid-table position most years. Shortly following Iranian goalkeeper Ahmad Reza Abedzadeh's retirement, he was linked with the head coaching job at Saipa. It never materialized, but the club signed another Iranian, Ali Daei in a move from Saba Battery. The club had finished third in the previous season and now, with Daei on the field and Werner Lorant as a coach, the team aimed to work for the title. Shortly after the season began though, Littbarski was fired and Ali Daei took on the role of player/coach. Captaining and coaching the team to the title marked the end of a successful career. Daei also scored the winner in the title winning game.

Daei extended his contract, this time as a full-time coach. He was appointed head coach of the national team but kept his role at Saipa until the end of the season.

Return to mid-table and relocation to Tehran
Following the title winning year which saw the team play in the AFC Champions League, Saipa turned back into the mid-table places of the league again. Before the start of the 2015–16 Persian Gulf Pro League season Saipa announced they had moved their home city from Karaj to nearby Tehran. Saipa also made some significant transfers to attempt to return to the top of the league, namely Gholamreza Rezaei, Reza Norouzi and former CA Osasuna captain Javad Nekounam.

Season-by-season
The table below chronicles the achievements of Saipa in various competitions since 1993.

Honours
Iran Pro League/First Division
Champions: 1993–94, 1994–95, 2006–07
Hazfi Cup
Winners: 1993–94

Players

Manager

Coaching staff

The following managers had managed Saipa since 1993:

References

External links

 Official website

 
Saipa
Association football clubs established in 1989
1989 establishments in Iran